Canadian College is a private college in Vancouver, British Columbia, Canada.

School information 
 School Environment: Downtown
 Building: Private college in Vancouver Downtown with 5-floors and 30 classrooms in total.
 Member of: PCTIA, FITT, AH&LA American Hotel & Lodging Association
 Staff and Advisors: 15 full-time (some of the languages covered: Spanish, Portuguese, Italian, French, Japanese, Korean, Chinese, Arabic, Polish, Russian, German, Turkish, etc.)
 Teachers: 5 full-time

Facilities 
 Computer Labs
 Other Facilities: Rooftop garden patio on 5th floor. Student Restaurant & Pub "eh! restaurant". Lunch & Rest areas throughout the school, Big Screen TV, Microwaves, Public Phones, Student Counselling Room, and Wheelchair friendly access.
 Nearby Facilities: Coffee/Light Snack Shops; Convenience Stores; Indoor Gym/Sports Facilities; Restaurants; Drug Store; Gift Shops; Park; Beaches; Hotels and Residences.

Program information 
 Courses: Business Management Diploma Co-op, International Trade Diploma Co-op, Hospitality Management Diploma Co-op, Project Management Diploma Co-op, Information Technology Diploma Co-op.
 Admission Requirements: High School Diploma, High School Completion Certificate, or equivalent. TOEFL 530, iBT 70, or IELTS 5.5 or TOEIC 750.
 Number of students per class: MIN(8); MAX(15); AVE(13)
This program is recognized by province as a  DESIGNATED LEARNING INSTITUTION.

External links 
 Canadian College Official Website
 PCTIA registered programs
 CCBST College Official Website

Colleges in British Columbia